Tilly Lauenstein (1916–2002) was a German film and television actress. She appeared as Gerda Hofer in the b/w tv series  "Alle Meine Tiere" as wife of vetenary surgeon Dr. Karl Hofer (Gustav Knuth).

Partial filmography

 Herbstmanöver (1936) - Magd
 Das große Abenteuer (1938)
 Chemistry and Love (1948) - Martina Höller
 Das Mädchen Christine (1949) - Courasche
 Anonymous Letters (1949) - Anita Grauberg
 The Stronger Woman (1953) - Dr. Hanna Claassen
 Stresemann (1957)
 Escape from Sahara (1958)
 Madeleine Tel. 13 62 11 (1958) - Thekla - Aging Call Girl
 For Love and Others (1959) - Maria von Stammer
 Menschen im Hotel (1959) - Madame Grusinskaja (voice, uncredited)
 Sweetheart of the Gods (1960)
 The Last Witness (1960) - Aufseherin
  (1961) - Frau Schlösser
 Adorable Julia (1962) - Evie, Julias Zofe
 Only a woman (1962) - Mrs. Starke
 Black Market of Love (1966) - Countess
 The Oldest Profession (1967) - (segment "Belle époque, La")
 The Monk with the Whip (1967) - Harriet Foster
 Klassenkeile (1969) - Marianne Kettelhut
 De Sade (1969) - Madame Grandcon
 Helgalein (1969)
 The Sex Nest (1970) - Ehefrau Clarissa Zibell
 ...aber Jonny! (1973) - Frau Rotter
 Once Upon a Time (1973) - Stiefmutter Pulle (voice)
 Looping (1981) - Carmen (voice, uncredited)
 Angry Harvest (1985) - Frau Kaminska
 Otto – Der Film (1985) - Dame
 Whopper Punch 777 (1986) - Dame mit Hut
 Young Love: Lemon Popsicle 7 (1987) - Lili Rosenberg (voice, uncredited)
 Himmelsheim (1988) - FrauPokorny
 Buster's Bedroom (1991) - Mrs. Noah
 Cosima's Lexikon (1992) - Charlotte Steinhöfel
  (1998) - Grandmother
 Otto – Der Katastrofenfilm (2000) - Old Woman with Dog (final film role)

References

Bibliography

External links

1916 births
2002 deaths
German television actresses
German film actresses
20th-century German actresses
Actors from Hesse
People from Bad Homburg vor der Höhe